Walter Reed Gusciora (born March 27, 1960) is an American Democratic Party politician who has served as the mayor of Trenton, New Jersey since 2018. He previously served from 1996 to 2018 in the New Jersey General Assembly, where he represented the 15th Legislative District.

Early life

Gusciora was born in Passaic, New Jersey and raised in Jamesburg, where he attended public schools and graduated from Jamesburg High School in 1978. Gusciora's father, Walter, worked at the New Jersey Department of Health in Trenton and the city was an integral part of his childhood. As a teenager, Gusciora worked for his family's company, Aardvark Pest Control, and in his free time, he spent time visiting Trenton's prominent museums and restaurants. He received a B.A. from The Catholic University of America (CUA) in Politics/International Relations and worked his way through college by working at the Library of Congress. After graduation, he worked on Capitol Hill in the congressional offices of U.S. Representatives Andy Ireland (D-FL) and the late Mike Synar (D-OK). Gusciora was awarded a J.D. in 1988 from the Seton Hall University School of Law. He also served as the prosecutor for Lawrence Township, Hopewell Borough, and Princeton.

Legislative career

In 1995, Gusciora beat Joseph Constance, a former Mercer County Freeholder and deputy police chief of Trenton Police Department, who received support from the National Rifle Association and campaigned against New Jersey's teachers' union. At the time, Republicans outnumbered Democrats 53 to 27 in the New Jersey State Legislature, and Constance received the momentum of the State's shift towards moderate Republicanism under popular Governor Christine Todd Whitman. Gusciora's victory maintained New Jersey's 15th Legislative District as a Democratic stronghold.

Gusciora was the Deputy Majority Leader between 2008 and 2018, and was the Assembly's Assistant Minority Leader from 1998 to 2001. He served as Chairman of the Assembly Regulatory Oversight, Federal Relations, and Reform Committee and the Environment and Solid Waste Committee; he was a member of the Assembly Financial Institutions and Insurance and Assembly Labor Committees.

Gusciora authored the "Paramount Safety" Law that changed the legal standard in child custody cases to protect the health and well-being of the child when abuse has occurred. He is the author of a law that streamlines services for people with developmental disabilities through the Department of Health and Human Services and the Department of Education. He is also the original prime sponsor of legislation that would allow patients to sue HMOs for malpractice and the "Senior Gold Prescription Discount Act," which expanded the state's prescription drug program for seniors.

2000-2001 Legislative session
Gusciora sponsored 4 pieces of legislation signed into law by Governor Christine Todd Whitman and Governor Donald DiFrancesco: “The Emergency Management Assistance Compact Act,” establishing new procedures for the application for services provided to the developmentally disabled, and appropriating funding to a no-kill animal organization.

Gusciora served as the co-sponsor of 80 pieces of legislation signed into law including legislation that prohibits leaving an animal unattended under inhumane conditions in a vehicle, enacts the “FamilyCare Health Coverage Act,” creates the Neighborhood Revitalization State Tax Credit Act, and the “Senior Gold Prescription Discount Act.”

2002-2003 Legislative session
Gusciora sponsored 35 pieces of legislation signed into law: Prohibiting firearm possession by persons convicted of serious violent crimes, making changes in the law concerning the cleanup of hazardous substances (environmental remediation), and appropriating millions in funding for local government open space acquisition and park development projects.

Gusciora co-sponsored 69 pieces of legislation signed into law: Expanding municipal power to address abandoned properties, permitting stem cell research in New Jersey, and prohibiting unsolicited telemarketing sales calls to certain customers.

2004-2005 Legislative session
Gusciora sponsored 39 pieces of legislation that became law including the "New Jersey Smoke-Free Air Act" which prohibits smoking in indoor public places and workplaces, legislation that established a state rental assistance program patterned after section 8 housing with the allocation of funds under the Fair Housing Act to program as permitted purpose, and legislation that requires hospital and satellite emergency departments to provide care to sexual assault victims and information about emergency contraception.

2006-2007 Legislative session

Gusciora was the sponsor of 25 pieces of legislation that became law: "Electronic Waste Recycling Act", establishing the Office of State Comptroller, and providing alternatives to prison for certain drug offenses.

Gusciora was the co-sponsor of 56 pieces of legislation that became law: Eliminating the death penalty in New Jersey, requiring boards of education to offer students instruction in gang violence prevention, enhancing penalties for possessing illegal guns.

2008-2009 Legislative session
Gusciora sponsored 37 pieces of legislation: Appropriating funding to the New Jersey Department of Environmental Protection for clean water environmental infrastructure projects, legalizing medical marijuana through the "New Jersey Compassionate Use Medical Marijuana Act", and established the Court Appointed Special Advocate (CASA) program.

Gusciora co-sponsored 25 pieces of legislation: Permitting wind and solar energy facilities in industrial zones, prohibiting individuals from purchasing more than one handgun in a calendar month, and authorizing the New Jersey Board of Public Utilities to provide grants for combined heat and power production, energy efficiency projects and programs promoting renewable energy and energy efficiency.

2010-2011 Legislative session
Gusciora sponsored 12 pieces of legislation: Allowing construction of wind dependent energy facilities on piers within 500 feet of mean high water line of tidal waters, allowing municipalities to reexamine municipal master plans every 10 years, and requiring instructions for workers filing unemployment insurance claims.

Gusciora co-sponsored 21 pieces of legislation: The "Anti-Bullying Bill of Rights Act", allowing students with disabilities to bring service animals to school, and authorizes companies under BPU jurisdiction to bill customers electronically upon their request.

2011 redistricting
The redistricting plan adopted following the 2010 U.S. Census moved Gusciora's residence out of the 15th district and into the heavily-Republican 16th. Trenton was the largest city in the old 15th district and remained the largest city in the newly configured 15th district.

2014–2015 Legislative session
In the 2014-2015 legislative session, Gusciora sponsored 14 bills and co-sponsored 34 bills.

Gusciora co-sponsored legislation creating the option to make a voluntary contribution for the support of local libraries on gross income tax returns, establishing a program to provide assistance to qualified veterans in in-patient and out-patient treatment programs to travel to in-state medical counseling, and requiring school bus drivers and school bus aides to attend a training program on interacting with students with special needs.

Similarly, during this legislative session, Gusciora co-sponsored several key criminal justice reform bills: "The Opportunity to Compete Act" establishing certain employment rights for persons with a criminal record, requiring the New Jersey Department of Corrections to make reports containing information concerning treatment and reentry initiative participation, extending "Overdose Prevention Act" immunity provisions to certain professionals and professional entities, and permits needle exchange programs to obtain standing order for opioid antidotes.

2016–2017 Legislative session
In the 2016-2017 legislative session, Gusciora sponsored twenty-eight bills and co-sponsored thirty-nine bills for a total of sixty-seven bills which were signed into law.

Gusciora sponsored legislation to authorize medical marijuana for qualifying patients with post-traumatic stress disorder, require that certain inmates with detainers be provided access to drug treatment programs, and exempt homeless individuals from paying fees for non-driver identification cards.

Gusciora co-sponsored "New Jersey Housing Assistance for Veterans Act," a pilot program to assist veterans with housing modification and rehabilitation as well as a bill to permit small, women-owned, or minority-owned businesses located in designated regional centers or planning areas to qualify for loans from the New Jersey Economic Development Agency (EDA) as if located in a designated urban center.

2018-2019 Legislative Session
Despite only serving in the New Jersey Legislature for the first six months of the 2018-2019 legislative session, Gusciora was the primary sponsor for 12 pieces of legislation and co-sponsor of 25 pieces of legislation that became law. Gusciora sponsored legislation restricting the use of isolated confinement in correctional facilities, requiring boards of education to include instruction that accurately portrays the political, economic, and social contributions of the LGBT community and persons with disabilities, and reinstating the duration of certain UEZs (areas within Trenton, Plainfield, Newark, Camden, and Bridgeton that provide tax benefits to commercial properties).

Gusciora co-sponsored legislation requiring a background check for private gun sales, reducing the maximum capacity of ammunition magazines to 10 rounds, and requiring "breakfast after the bell" in all schools with 70% or more of students eligible for free or reduced price meals.

Role as mayor
He defeated businessman Paul Perez to become Mayor of Trenton in 2018, earning 52 percent of the vote in a runoff election on June 12 since no candidate won the 50 percent threshold or more in the May 8 election.

Youth initiatives

Gusciora convened the first youth council since the Doug Palmer administration (a decade prior): This consistent of students, between eight grade and high school seniors, representing each of the four wards, who provided counsel to Gusciora.

Gusciora's administration hired a record number of city youth for summer employment and expanded summer programming for city students.

Gusciora's initiative, "Trenton Production and Knowledge Innovation Campus" (TPKIC), was awarded the Innovative Challenge grant by the New Jersey Economic Development Authority. The City partnered with Princeton University, Rider University, The College of New Jersey, Thomas Edison State University, and Mercer County Community College to build the vision behind the application, which seeks to support start-up businesses, local creators, students and faculty at partner colleges and universities, and Trenton Public Schools students and recent graduates.

Gusciora launch of the Trenton Youth "WIN" App, a mobile application, which is designed to connect City youth with access to essential services. The City of Trenton, in conjunction with the County of Mercer and Continuum of Care partners, accepted the pledge to prevent and end youth homelessness in 2020. As part of the United States Interagency Council on Homelessness (USICH) Opening Doors: Federal Strategic Plan to Prevent and End Homelessness, the City of Trenton has developed community partnerships to promote, educate, and commit to eliminating homelessness within the Capital City. The WIN application has been identified as a crucial way to establish channels of communication with youth who may feel embarrassed when going to a governmental agency. ”

Housing and economic development
Within his first 6 months of holding office, Gusciora reported that his administration had received $17 million in new public and private grant funding and that there were pursuing $19 million in grants and aid.

Gusciora also stated that $6 million in Community Development Block Grants (from 2011 to 2018), from the U.S. Department of Housing and Urban Development, was in the process of being unfrozen. On January 21, 2020, Gusciora stated that the U.S. Department of Housing and Urban Development had decided to release funds to the Capital City because of Gusciora's re-hiring of key positions needed for the appropriate management of federal funds. While most of the funding was used to pay back the city for past projects, the rest will go into public facility renovations and improvements for senior centers.

In September 2019, Gusciora touted the results of Trenton's monthly public property auction as the largest and most successful in the city's history. On that day alone, 86 City-owned properties, valued at a collective $3.3 million, were auctioned off, and went back on the tax rolls. Around the same time, Gusciora and the Trenton Housing Authority (THA) won $1.3 million in Choice Neighborhood Planning and Action Grant funds, distributed by the U.S. Department of Housing and Urban Development to develop a comprehensive neighborhood transformation plan for Donnelly Homes.

In December 2019, Ordinance 19–80 and 19–79, legislation that Gusciora designed and advocated for was passed by the City Council. The legislation authorized sidewalk cafés (without City approval) and the distribution of alcohol for brunch on Sunday mornings earlier (earlier than neighboring municipalities).

Public safety
On October 15, 2019, Gusciora announced that the city had been awarded $85,000 from the U.S. Department of Homeland Security through the Federal Emergency Management Agency's 2019 Port Security Grant Program. The funds subsidized the purchase of 3 watercraft with engines, dive rescue equipment, and additional supplies.

Gusciora spearheaded the creation of a Real Time Crime Center, a partnership with the New Jersey State Police, to prevent future criminal activity.

In 2022, Darrell L. Clarke and members of the Philadelphia City Council met with Gusciora to learn about Trenton's crime reduction strategies after Trenton went three summer months without a homicide.

Health and human services
In November 2019, Gusciora shared that the City of Trenton's Department of Health had won a $95,000 grant "Strengthening Local Public Health Capacity Grant Operations" from the New Jersey Department of Health. The funds are being utilized to supplement Gusciora's efforts to reduce the number of residents affected by vaccine-preventable illnesses.

Gusciora launched Trenton's first Neighborhood Health Clinic, which provides free vaccinations for city residents and is expected to provide primary services in the future.

Veteran's issues
In November 2019, Gusciora collaborated with veteran Willie Smith and a student leader at Trenton Central High School to win Governor Murphy's "We Value our Veterans Community Award" for City initiatives to help City veterans access medical care, find employment, and locate permanent housing.

COVID-19 response
Gusciora's published a document "COVID-19: Trenton Testing Status Report," which outlined steps that his administration had taken to reduce the fatality rate of COVID-19 in the Capital City during the pandemic. The report was the first of its kind written by a municipality in New Jersey and published publicly. At the time of the report, the city's fatality rate of those infected with COVID-19 was 2.8% while the fatality rate in the state of New Jersey was 7.4%. Gusciora outlined a set of proactive steps that the city had taken to increase the amount of testing, secure personal protective equipment, and coordinate with other governmental agencies.

One of Gusciora's policies, created a business loan program for city small businesses, who could apply for up to $20,000 in emergency loans. The Trenton Emergency Loan Program used existing funds from the city's urban enterprise zone and exceeded state and county programs set up to assist businesses with their economic recovery.

Executive leadership
In July 2019, Gusciora announced that he had been selected as one of 40 mayors to participate in the Bloomberg Harvard City Leadership Initiative, which is an initiative founded by Michael Bloomberg of Bloomberg Philanthropies and three-term mayor of New York City as well as Harvard University. The mission of the program is to inspire and strengthen city leaders as well as equip them with the tools to lead high-performing and innovative cities.

Politics
Gusciora is a supporter of gay rights and same-sex marriage. In December 2006, he publicly acknowledged his homosexuality, thereby becoming the first ever openly gay member of the New Jersey Legislature. In January 2012, he was joined by Assemblyman Tim Eustace, the openly gay mayor of Maywood, who was elected to the General Assembly from the 38th District.

On Governor Chris Christie's opposition to a bill to legalize same-sex marriage in the state, Gusciora stated "Govs. Lester Maddox and George Wallace would have found allies in Chris Christie over efforts by the Justice Department to end segregation in the South", and "[Christie] would have been happy to have a referendum on civil rights rather than fighting and dying in the streets of the South."

Christie responded, "What I said was I’m sure that civil rights advocates would have liked to have this as another option but it was not available to them, yet you have numbnuts like Reed Gusciora who put out a statement comparing me to George Wallace and Lester Maddox." The two later amended their differences.

See also

 LGBT culture in New Jersey

References

External links
New Jersey Legislature financial disclosure forms:
2010  2009  2008  2007  2006  2005  2004 
Campaign website
Assembly Member Reed Gusciora, Project Vote Smart

|-

1960 births
21st-century American politicians
Catholic University of America alumni
Gay politicians
LGBT mayors of places in the United States
LGBT state legislators in New Jersey
Living people
Democratic Party members of the New Jersey General Assembly
New Jersey lawyers
Mayors of Trenton, New Jersey
People from Jamesburg, New Jersey
People from Princeton, New Jersey
Politicians from Passaic, New Jersey
Politicians from Trenton, New Jersey
Seton Hall University School of Law alumni